Albert Jackson (12 September 1943 – 2 December 2014) was an English footballer who played as a forward.

References

1943 births
2014 deaths
English footballers
English expatriate footballers
Association football defenders
Association football forwards
Manchester United F.C. players
Oldham Athletic A.F.C. players
Bangor City F.C. players
Wigan Athletic F.C. players
Dallas Tornado players
Droylsden F.C. players
English expatriate sportspeople in the United States
Expatriate soccer players in the United States
Mossley A.F.C. players